A cowlick is a section of human hair that stands straight up or lies at an angle at odds with the style in which the rest of an individual's hair is worn.

The most common site of a human cowlick is in the crown, but they can show up anywhere. They also sometimes appear in the front and back of the head.

The term "cowlick" dates from the late 16th century, when physician Richard Haydock used it in his translation of Gian Paolo Lomazzo: "The lockes or plaine feakes of haire called cow-lickes, are made turning upwards."

Management
For people who are more concerned about cowlick management, more drastic measures may be used. Electrology, waxing, and even cosmetic surgery can be used to permanently correct the cowlick.

See also
Ahoge
Hair whorl
Hairy ball theorem

References

Hairdressing